Nora Smith may refer to:
 Nora Archibald Smith, American children's author
 Nora Lawrence Smith, American newspaper publisher and activist